Commander Peter Rodney "Roddy" Elias (27 February 1921 – 24 January 2015) was a Royal Navy officer who played an important role in the hunt for the German battleship Bismarck, for which he was awarded the Distinguished Service Cross.

References 

1921 births
2015 deaths
Royal Navy officers
Royal Navy officers of World War II
Recipients of the Distinguished Service Cross (United Kingdom)
People from Woking